Wilfried Senoner (20 January 1945 – 26 March 1999) was an Italian artist.

Education
Wilfried Senoner was born in Urtijëi, son of the sculptor Gabriel Senoner. Thus, from his early childhood on, he was well acquainted with the art of carving. After graduating from the Urtijëi Art School, he continued to improve his skills in his father's workshop. From 1964 to 1968 he studied at the Brera Academy in Milan with the well known professors Francesco Messina, Marino Marini and Alik Cavaliere. He graduated from the academy with first-class degrees in sculpture and art history.

Early career
During his stay in Milan he met with many artists and being a regular visitor to their workshops he discovered his love for painting. From 1972 to 1974 Wilfried worked with an architect in Augsburg, Germany. Meanwhile he published a pocket book of satirical cartoons "Wirr Warr", for which he got a prize. Back in Italy, he started a ten-year-long career as art teacher at different schools in Urtijëi and Sëlva.

Art years
In 1984 he decided to settle down as a freelance artist. His oevre expresses his versatility and taste for experimenting with different techniques, like fresco painting on houses and church facades or enamel painting for the restoration of altars etc. In Germany he created huge altars in various styles (ranging from Gothic to modern art). From 1967 on, he exhibited his works in either individual or collective exhibitions and participated in competitions, where he won a number of awards. In his last years of life, previous to his fatal skiing accident, he worked at a frenetic pace on a multitude of projects in Italy and abroad.

His works are to be seen in churches all over Europe. Some of the biggest altars are situated in Germany, like:

1984/5 Schönbrunn, church design
1985/7 Main altar and people's altar in Bogen (8m)
1986/7 Main altar and people's altar in Eschenbach (14m)
Eschenbach Parish
1985/90 interior church design in Rothenkirchen (15m x 9m)
1988 2 side altars in Pollenfeld (7m)

Single exhibitions

1967 Circolo Artistico, Urtijëi – pittura e scultura
1972 Piccola Galleria, Brescia – pittura e scultura
1972 Galleria Willy, Vilpian – scultura
1972 Circolo Artistico, Urtijëi – scultura all’aperto
1980 Galleria Piccinini, Cortina d’Ampezzo – quadri tridimensionali1984 Galleria Mazzini 3, Montecchio di Pesaro – scultura e grafica
1985 Circolo Artistico, Urtijëi – (con Heini Unterhofer) – colore e suono
1987 Atelier Rudi Oberrauch, Bolzano - scultura
1987 Galerie Pobitzer, Merano – scultura e grafica
1989 Galleria Michelangelo, Firenze - pittura
1989 Galleria S. Francesco, Assisi – scultura1990 Scuola elementare, St. Magdalena/Villnöß - pittura

Collective exhibitions

1966 Palazzo Comunale, Abbiategrasso - grafica
1967 Galleria Permanente, Milan - scultura
1968 Galleria delle Ore, Milan – grafica e scultura
1970 Erste Kunstgalerie, Gersthofen/Augsburg – scultura
1972 Stadtturmgalerie, Innsbruck – grafica
1973 „Die große Schwäbische“, Augsburg – pittura tridimensionale
1975 Piccola Galleria, Brescia – scultura
1977 Ruhrland Museum, Essen – scultura
1978 Circolo Artistico, Urtijëi – scultura all’aperto
1979 Circolo Artistico, Urtijëi – scultura e grafica1981 Palais Palffy, Vienna – pittura tridimensionale
1981 Galleria Bevilacqua la Masa, Palazzo Correr, Venezia
1983 Expo Arte, Bari – scultura e pittura
1984 Circolo Artistico, Urtijëi – scultura
1984 Galleria Mazzini 3, Montecchio di Pesaro – scultura
1986 Galleria Museo, Bolzano – concorso di scultura
1987 Kunstgalerie, Bolzano – concorso di pittura
1989 Galerie Prisma, Bolzano – concorso di scultura
1989 Palazzo Comunale, Assisi – scultura1990 Centro culturale, Pietralba - scultura
1990 Centro culturale, Pineta di Laives – scultura
1990 Palazzo Gementi, Bardolino - scultura
1994 Arena, Verona - scultura1995 Collegio Cairoli, Pavia - scultura
1996 Trostburg Castle - scultura

References 

http://www.braunsberg.org
 http://www.sigischmidt.de
 http://www.micura.it
 http://www.circologardena.org

Italian artists
People from Urtijëi
1945 births
1999 deaths
Skiing deaths
Italian schoolteachers
Brera Academy alumni